Zinc finger protein 133 is a protein that in humans is encoded by the ZNF133 gene.

References

Further reading